Jennifer May "Jenni" Forbes is an Australian-born singer-songwriter based in Los Angeles. Her song, "I Want You", co-written with Peter Northcote, was performed by fellow Mushroom Records artist, Toni Pearen and peaked in the top 10 on the ARIA Singles Chart in April 1993.

Biography

Jennifer May Forbes grew up in the Sydney suburb of Cremorne Point. By the age of 11 she sang her first commercial for Australian radio. By 14 she was regularly doing both voice-overs and vocals for television commercials, and singing and penning songs with her first live band.

Forbes' recording debut, "Love Letters", appears on the soundtrack of Russell Crowe's 1990 movie, The Crossing along with tracks by Crowded House, David Bowie and the Proclaimers. Soon after, she was signed to Mushroom Records and went on a writing trip to the United Kingdom and United States to work with some of the "Grammy Greats."

An album was recorded in London and two singles were released –  "Dream On (Kathy's Song)" (March 1993) and "I'll Be There for You" (September 1995), and an album, I, No Y released in October, for which she wrote nine of eleven songs. An EP, Baby Come Back (the title track, "Baby Come Back", is a cover of the Player's hit), followed in November. In the late 1990s she toured with Joe Cocker and Take That in Australia.

Forbes' greatest success as a songwriter was when her song, "I Want You", co-written with Peter Northcote, was recorded by fellow Mushroom Records artist, Toni Pearen — it became a top 10 hit on the ARIA Singles Chart.

Sources
  Note: [on-line] version established at White Room Electronic Publishing Pty Ltd in 2007 and was expanded from the 2002 edition.

References

External links
 MySpace profile

Australian singer-songwriters
Living people
Year of birth missing (living people)
Musicians from Sydney
Mushroom Records artists